Toxicoscordion paniculatum  is a species of flowering plant known by the common names foothill deathcamas, panicled death-camas, and sand-corn. It is widely distributed across much of the western United States, especially in the mountains and deserts of the Great Basin region west of the Rocky Mountains. It grows in many types of habitat, including sagebrush plateau, grasslands, forests, and woodlands, etc.

Toxicoscordion paniculatum is a perennial wildflower growing from a brown or black bulb up to 5 centimeters long by 3 wide. The stem grows up to 70 centimeters long. The leaves are linear in shape, measuring up to 50 centimeters long. Most of the leaves are at the base of the stem and there may be a few reduced leaves above. The inflorescence is an open panicle of flowers, becoming dense at the tip. (The flower pictured here appears to be of the close relative Toxicoscordion venenosum; see Burke Museum external link for accurate descriptions.)  The panicle contains up to 80 flowers, most of which are bisexual; some flowers at the end of branches and near the base of the panicle are only staminate (male), or are sterile. Each flower has six tepals, the inner three being slightly larger than the outer, measuring about 3 to 6 millimeters in length. The tepals are cream-colored, each with a yellowish green gland at the base. The fruit is a capsule 1 or 2 centimeters long.

This plant is toxic to animals, but livestock generally avoid it because it is unpalatable. Cases of human poisoning by ingestion of the bulbs have been documented as well.

References

External links
Jepson Manual Treatment
Burke Museum of Natural History and Culture, University of Washington, Toxicoscordion paniculatum many color photos plus Washington State distribution map
Calphotos Photo gallery, University of California @ Berkeley, Zigadenus paniculatus
Wildflowers of the United States, Foothill Death Camas, Foothills Deathcamas, Panicled Death Camas, Sand-corn - Toxicoscordion paniculatum color photos
Southwest Colorado Wildflowers, Anticlea & Toxicoscordion - color photos of several species

paniculatume
Flora of the Western United States
Flora of California
Flora of the Great Basin
Flora of the Sierra Nevada (United States)
Plants described in 1834
Flora without expected TNC conservation status